James Grant Schoenfeld (born September 4, 1952) is a Canadian professional ice hockey executive and former player. He most recently was the assistant general manager with the New York Rangers of the National Hockey League (NHL), as well as an interim assistant coach. He was previously a player and a head coach in the NHL for several teams.

Biography

Playing career
After a junior career with the London Knights, Hamilton Red Wings, and Niagara Falls Flyers, he was drafted by the Buffalo Sabres and would play eleven seasons with that team, including spending time as the team's captain.  He also played for the Detroit Red Wings and Boston Bruins.  He retired from hockey in 1985.

Coaching/general management career
Since retirement, he has served as the head coach of several NHL teams, including the Sabres, New Jersey Devils, Washington Capitals, and Phoenix Coyotes. As an NHL head coach, Schoenfeld has compiled a record of 256–246–78 (.509). In 2007, he was promoted from the head coach of the Hartford Wolf Pack of the American Hockey League to assistant general manager of the New York Rangers, the Wolf Pack's NHL affiliate. At the time, he was also assigned to be the general manager of the Wolf Pack until he was relieved of those duties in 2017.

Schoenfeld is remembered for an altercation with NHL referee Don Koharski after game 3 of the 1988 Wales Conference Finals after his New Jersey Devils lost 6–1 to the Boston Bruins. During the argument Koharski fell down and falsely accused Schoenfeld of pushing him. As people yelled at Schoenfeld, at least one saying "you're done", believing that he'd pushed Koharski, Schoenfeld continued arguing with Koharski who said he hoped that the entire exchange was on videotape. Schoenfeld yelled back, "Good, 'cause you fell, you fat pig! Have another doughnut! Have another doughnut!" as Koharski and the other officials headed to their dressing room. Schoenfeld was suspended by League disciplinarian Brian O'Neill for the following game, but the Devils sought a court order to overturn the suspension. About 40 minutes before the start of the game, New Jersey Superior Court Judge James F. Madden issued a restraining order allowing Schoenfeld to coach, subsequently triggering a walkout by the scheduled game 4 officials: referee Dave Newell and linesmen Gord Broseker and Ray Scapinello. After more than an hour's delay, three local off-ice officials – Paul McInnis, Jim Sullivan and Vin Godleski – were tracked down to work the game. The Devils went on to win the game by a score of 3–1, but Schoenfeld was later suspended for game 5, fined $1,000, his team $10,000, and the officials returned to work.

This incident was parodied later in the movie Wayne's World, when a rather large and apathetic police officer named Officer Koharski hung out at the counter of Stan Mikita's Doughnut Shop. The movie used Stan Mikita's as the name of a doughnut shop, as a parody reference to the chain Tim Hortons. Coincidentally, during the final part of his career, Tim Horton himself teamed on defense with a young Jim Schoenfeld with the Buffalo Sabres. Later, Schoenfeld often paired with Jerry Korab.

On July 23, 2007, Schoenfeld was named New York Rangers assistant general manager to Glen Sather, replacing Don Maloney (who had become general manager of the Phoenix Coyotes franchise). Ken Gernander took over the head coach position in Hartford, while Schoenfeld retained his position of general manager for the farm team. On April 26, 2009, while serving as interim assistant coach for the Rangers under head coach John Tortorella, Schoenfeld stepped in to act as head coach for game 6 of the Eastern Conference Quarterfinals against the Washington Capitals following Tortorella's one-game suspension for inappropriate fan contact in game 5 of the series. He stepped down from his positions of senior vice president and assistant general manager on May 16, 2019.

Broadcasting career
In 1992, he joined ESPN as color commentator for regular season games with play-by-play man Gary Thorne. However, in the 1993 playoffs, he worked as the studio analyst with Al Morganti, the other studio analyst, and host John Saunders.

Musical career 
Schoenfeld also recorded two albums during his time in Buffalo, both of which were recorded in collaboration with Buffalo Music Hall of Fame singer and producer John Valby (before Valby's turn toward more ribald material). The first, Schony, was released in 1973 and credited solely to Schoenfeld; the album consisted mostly of cover versions of a broad variety of songs (often radically rearranged from the originals), with two originals: the Valby-penned bluegrass tune "Barbecue in Heaven" and Schoenfeld's own "Before." He recorded a second album in 1974 entitled The Key Is Love; this album, which was credited to both Schoenfeld and Valby, consisted of all original songs.

Career statistics

Coaching record

References

External links
 

1952 births
Living people
Arizona Coyotes coaches
Boston Bruins players
Buffalo Sabres captains
Buffalo Sabres coaches
Buffalo Sabres draft picks
Buffalo Sabres players
Canadian ice hockey defencemen
Canadian people of German descent
Cincinnati Swords players
Detroit Red Wings players
Hamilton Red Wings (OHA) players
Ice hockey people from Ontario
London Knights players
National Hockey League broadcasters
National Hockey League first-round draft picks
New Jersey Devils coaches
New York Rangers coaches
New York Rangers executives
Niagara Falls Flyers players
Sportspeople from Cambridge, Ontario
Washington Capitals coaches
Canadian ice hockey coaches